This is a list of members of the Western Australian Legislative Assembly from 1980 to 1983:

Notes
 On 30 April 1981, the Labor member for Kalgoorlie, Ted Evans, died, just one year into his first term. Labor candidate Ian Taylor won the resulting by-election on 20 June 1981.
 On 31 January 1982, the Premier and Liberal member for Nedlands, Sir Charles Court, resigned. His son, Richard Court, won the resulting by-election on 13 March 1982.
 In October 1981, the Labor member for Swan, Jack Skidmore, resigned from the party to sit as an independent. He subsequently resigned from parliament on 31 January 1982. Labor candidate Gordon Hill won the resulting by-election on 13 March 1982.
 On 12 May 1982, Ray McPharlin, the member for Mount Marshall, resigned from the National Party and joined the National Country Party.

Members of Western Australian parliaments by term